Cottonwood Island may refer to:

Cottonwood Island (Nevada)
Cottonwood Island (Washington)